Littley Green is a hamlet in the civil parish of Great Waltham and the Chelmsford borough of Essex, England.

At the north-west edge of the hamlet and within the parish is the  residential farm of Littley Park. The house is timber framed and plastered, dates to the 16th century, and is Grade II listed. Littley Park was in the possession of Richard Rich (1496/7 – 1567), Lord Chancellor and founder of Felsted School, who gained the property after the suppression of the monasteries. It was put up for sale in 2017 at a guide price of above £5m. 

Other listed buildings at Littley Green included the timber framed and plastered houses, dating from the 15th to 17th century, of Bywater House, Butlers, Butlers Hall, Hope cottage, Mabb's Farmhouse, and Oak House which was formerly the Royal Oak Inn.

From 1882 to at least 1914, Littley Green was in the ecclesiastical parish of Ford End, also known as Forth End, which was formed out of Great Waltham, and centred on the village of Ford End  to the west. In 1882, Littley Green had a beer retailer and pig dealer, and one farmer at Littley Park; in 1894 two, with the extra farmer at Butler's Lodge. A licensed victualler at The Compasses public house was listed in the late 19th century to at least the First World War; in 1894 he was also a shopkeeper. In 1902, a blacksmith and beer retailer was listed, but just a blacksmith in 1914.

Littley Green has a public house called The Compasses Inn.

References

External links 
 Great Waltham Parish web site
 

Hamlets in Essex
Great Waltham